The Central District of Shahr-e Babak County is a district (bakhsh) in Shahr-e Babak County, Kerman Province, Iran. At the 2006 census, its population was 74,551, in 17,680 families.  The district has three cities: Shahr-e Babak, Khatunabad, and Khursand. The district has six rural districts (dehestan): Estabraq Rural District, Khatunabad Rural District, Khursand Rural District, Madvarat Rural District, Meymand Rural District, and Pa Qaleh Rural District.

References 

Shahr-e Babak County
Districts of Kerman Province